Elsie Worthington Clews Parsons (November 27, 1875 – December 19, 1941) was an American anthropologist, sociologist, folklorist, and feminist who studied Native American tribes—such as the Tewa and Hopi—in Arizona, New Mexico, and Mexico. She helped found The New School. She was associate editor for The Journal of American Folklore (1918–1941), president of the American Folklore Society (1919–1920), president of the American Ethnological Society (1923–1925), and was elected the first female president of the American Anthropological Association (1941) right before her death.

She earned her bachelor's degree from Barnard College in 1896. She received her master’s degree (1897) and Ph.D. (1899) from Columbia University.

Every other year, the American Ethnological Society awards the Elsie Clews Parsons Prize for the best graduate student essay, in her honor.

Biography
Parsons was the daughter of Henry Clews, a wealthy New York banker, and Lucy Madison Worthington. Her brother, Henry Clews Jr., was an artist. On September 1, 1900, in Newport, Rhode Island, she married future three-term progressive Republican congressman Herbert Parsons, an associate and political ally of President Teddy Roosevelt. When her husband was a member of Congress, she published two then-controversial books under the pseudonym John Main.

Parsons became interested in anthropology in 1910. She believed that folklore was a key to understanding a culture and that anthropology could be a vehicle for social change.

Her work Pueblo Indian Religion is considered a classic; here she gathered all her previous extensive work and that of other authors. It is, however, marred by intrusive and deceptive research techniques.

She is, however, pointed to by current critical scholars as an archetypical example of an "Antimodern Feminist" thinker, known for their infatuation with Native American Indians that often manifested as a desire to preserve a "traditional" and "pure" Indian identity, irrespective of how Native Peoples themselves approached issues of modernization or cultural change. Scholars Sandy Grande and Margaret D. Jacobs argue that her racist and objectivizing tendencies towards indigenous peoples of the Americas are evidenced, for example, by her willingness to change her name and appropriate a Hopi identity primarily to increase her access to research sites and participants.

Feminist ideas 
Parsons feminist beliefs were viewed as extremely radical for her time. She was a proponent of trial marriages, divorce by mutual consent and access to reliable contraception, which she wrote about in her book The Family (1906). She also wrote about the effects society had on the growth of individuals, and more precisely the effect of gender role expectations and how they stifle individual growth for both women and men. The Family (1906) was met with such back-lash she published her second book Religious Chastity (1913) under the pseudonym "John Main" as to not affect her husband, Herbert Parsons political career. Her ideas were so far ahead that only after her death did they begin to be discussed. This has led to her becoming recognized as one of the early pioneers of the feminist movement. Her writings and her lifestyle challenged conventional gender roles at the time and helped spark the conversation for gender equality.

Works

Early works of sociology
The Family (1906)
Religious Chastity (1913)
The Old-Fashioned Woman (1913)
Fear and Conventionality (1914)
 
Social Freedom (1915)
Social Rule (1916)

Anthropology
The Social Organization of the Tewa of New Mexico (1929)
Hopi and Zuni Ceremonialism (1933)
Pueblo Indian Religion (1939)

Ethnographies
Mitla: Town of the Souls (1936)
Peguche (1945)

Research in folklore
Folk-Lore from the Cape Verde Islands (1923)
Folk-Lore of the Sea Islands, S.C. (1924)
Micmac Folklore (1925)
Folk-Lore of the Antilles, French and English (3v., 1933–1943)

Reprints
 
 
 
 Parsons, Elsie Clews (1996). Pueblo Indian Religion. 2 vols. Introductions by Ramon Gutierrez and Pauline Turner Strong. Bison Books reprint. Lincoln and London: University of Nebraska Press.

See also
 Ruth Benedict
 Franz Boas
 Cape Verdean Creole
 Château de la Napoule
 History of feminism
 List of Barnard College people
 Zora Neale Hurston
 Mabel Dodge Luhan
 Margaret Mead
 Pueblo clown
 Taos Pueblo

References

Further reading

External links

 Elsie Clews Parsons Papers at the American Philosophical Society
 Elsie Clews Parsons, The Journal of a Feminist by Professor Catherine Lavender, City University of New York
 Elsie Clews Parsons, Minnesota State University, Mankato
 Stacy A. Cordery. "Review of Desley Deacon, Elsie Clews Parsons: Inventing Modern Life," H-Women, H-Net Reviews, November, 1998.
 Working Woman by Tanya Luhrmann, The New York Times

1875 births
1941 deaths
American anthropologists
American anthropology writers
American ethnologists
American women anthropologists
Women ethnologists
American sociologists
American folklorists
Women folklorists
Feminist studies scholars
Barnard College alumni
Elsie
Columbia Graduate School of Arts and Sciences alumni
Presidents of the American Folklore Society